Pattinathar is a name identified with two different Tamil individuals, one of 10th century AD and another of 14th century AD.

10th century Pattinathar 
The 10th century AD Pattinathar was a poet whose five works are included in the sacred Shaivite canon. Tirumurai.

14th century Pattinathar 
He was born in the port-town Kaveripoompattinam to a wealthy mercantile family, who himself was a merchant before giving up his materialistic way of life. He became the guru and contemporary of another ascetic philosopher, Pattirakiriyar. Pattirakiriyar was a king of Kongu Nadu before becoming a religious mendicant under Pattinathar.

Search for divinity 
The divine child grew up and followed in his father's footsteps. Once the father sent him on a ship with a good lot of merchandise and when he came he just brought back sacks full of paddy husks. The father was angry and locked him up in a room and after going to the harbor, threw the husks out. He was surprised to see they were all gold; every dried piece of the husk turned out to be gold dust and also had precious gems in the sack. He hurried home to see his son. He was not in the locked room. His wife gave him a small box the son had given before he disappeared. In it was a palm-leaf manuscript and a needle without an eyelet. On the script were the following words (in English for understanding):

"Not even an eyeless needle will accompany you in the final journey of life."

Pattinathar (Thiruvengadar) realized the philosophy and wisdom of the words, and renounced everything – his wife, his wealth, his kith and kin and all other mundane attachments. With only a loin cloth he left. He sang many philosophical songs to enlighten people on the blissful state of renunciation. He sang about the human life and its complex dimensions, made his lyrics more appealing to the common man. He urged repeatedly not to be attached to the body and its pleasures, for the body perishes and becomes food for animals and worms. Think of God and surrender at God's feet.

Pattinatthar worshiped Shiva at the Srikalahasti temple, which has inspired great poetic and musical works. The samadhi [attained salvation in this place] of Pattinatthar is a historic landmark located on the Ennore Expressway in Tiruvottiyur. It is believed to be around 500 years to 1100 years old.

Inside the Nandrudayaan Vinayagar temple in Devadhanam, Tiruchirappalli, an idol for Pattinatthar is found.

Folklore of Bharthari and Pattinathar

Bharthari was the elder son of King Gandharva-Sena, and received the kingdom of Ujjain from the celestial god Indra and the King of Dhara.

When Bharthari was king of 'Ujjayani' (modern day Ujjain) in his state there lived a Brahman who after years of austerities was given the fruit of immortality from the celestial tree of Kalpavriksha. The Brahman presented the same to his monarch, Raja Bharthari, who in turn, passed it on to his love, the beautiful, Pinglah Rani or Ananga Sena (as per Maha Kavi Kalidas), Raja Bhartrhari's last and youngest wife. The queen, being in love with the Head police officer of the state, Mahipaala, presented the fruit to him, who further passed it on to his beloved, Lakha, one of the maids of honour. Eventually, Lakha being in love with the king presented the fruit back to the king. Having completed the circle, the fruit revealed the downsides of infidelity to the king, he summoned the queen and ordered her beheading, and ate the fruit himself. After that he abdicated the throne, to his younger brother Vikramaditya, and became a religious mendicant.

He later became a disciple of Pattinatthar (Swetharanyar is poorvashram name of this saint from Poompuhar, Tamil Nadu) who first indulged in an argument about samsari and sanyasi with king Bhartrhari. Later during the conversation Pattinathar said that all women have 'dual mind' and it might be the true case even with Parameswari. King conveyed this news to rani Pingalah and she ordered Pattinathar to get punished and to sit in 'kalu maram' (Tree, whose top portion would be sharpened like a pencil and whole tree is fully coated with oil, a person who is punished to sit in the top will be split into two pieces), they tried to kill Pattinathar, but kalu maram started burning and nothing happened to Pattinathar, the king received this news and proceeded to Pattinathar and asked him to prepare to die the next day, but Pattinathar replied, "I'm ready right now, to die". The next day king came with tears in his eyes and released saint from jail because he actually noticed queen Pingalah in love with horsemen that night. He relinquished his empire, wealth, even full coat dress and dressed in a simple kovanam (loin cloth), and the king became a disciple of Pattinatthar and got mukthi (salvation) in Tiruvottiyur temple.

His Disciple Bharthari, or Bhadhragiri (as he is called in popular Tamil folk culture) wrote a collection of Tamil poetic verses called Meignana Pulambal

In popular culture
In 1935, Saint Pattinathar film was released, starring C. S. Sundaramurthy Odhuvaar in the title role. In 1962, a later day version came out with T. M. Soundararajan as the Saint Pattinatthar.

References

See also
Poems of Saint Pattinathar (பட்டினத்தார் பாடல்கள்) - Shaivam Website 
Biography of Saint Pattinathar (பட்டினத்தார் வரலாறு) - Thevaraam Website
Shaivism
Nayanars

Indian Hindu spiritual teachers
10th-century Indian poets
14th-century Indian people